Palaeoagraecia is an Asian genus of bush crickets in the tribe Agraeciini, belonging to the 'conehead' subfamily Conocephalinae.  Species have been recorded from Bangladesh, China, Korea, Japan, Indo-China, Malesia, New Guinea and western Pacific islands.

Species
The Orthoptera Species File lists:
Palaeoagraecia ascenda Ingrisch, 1998
Palaeoagraecia brunnea Ingrisch, 1998 - type species (locality Thailand)
Palaeoagraecia chyzeri Bolívar, 1905
Palaeoagraecia luteus Matsumura & Shiraki, 1908
Palaeoagraecia philippina Karny, 1926

References

External links 
 

Conocephalinae
Tettigoniidae genera
Orthoptera of Asia
Orthoptera of Indo-China